Iago Herrerín Buisán (born 25 January 1988) is a Spanish professional footballer who plays  as a goalkeeper for Valencia CF.

He spent most of his career affiliated to Athletic Bilbao, making 119 first-team appearances. He also played on loan at Numancia in the Segunda División and Leganés in La Liga.

Club career

Athletic Bilbao
Born in Bilbao, Biscay, Herrerín was a product of Athletic Bilbao's youth ranks. He played a couple of months with the farm team CD Basconia, being loaned to Barakaldo CF in January 2007.

After returning in the summer, Herrerín was assigned to the B team in the Segunda División B.

Atlético Madrid
In July 2010, Herrerín decided to leave Athletic in search for "a new life in football", signing a contract with Atlético Madrid and playing two full seasons with the reserves also in the third division.

On 8 January 2011, in a match against neighbouring Getafe CF B, Herrerín scored the 3–2 winning goal for the hosts in the 72nd minute.

Return to Athletic
Herrerín returned to Athletic Bilbao in the summer of 2012, signing a two-year deal and immediately being loaned to CD Numancia in a season-long move. On 18 August he made his Segunda División debut, in a 2–0 home win against Sporting de Gijón.

In July 2013, Herrerín signed a new contract with the Lions and was definitively promoted to the main squad. On 23 August he played his first match in La Liga, keeping a clean sheet in the 2–0 victory over CA Osasuna at the Anoeta Stadium. He spent his first year, however, as backup to longtime incumbent Gorka Iraizoz.

Herrerín was first choice in the Copa del Rey in the 2014–15 campaign, helping his team reach the final of the tournament for the first time in three years. On 25 May 2015 he signed a new deal with the club, running until 2017. 

In 2015–16, Herrerín played both domestic cup and UEFA Europa League games while appearing twice in the league during Iraizoz' red card suspension. On 8 June 2016, he agreed to an extension until 2019.

On 30 November 2016, after being overtaken by Kepa Arrizabalaga, Herrerín was loaned to fellow top-tier side CD Leganés until the end of the season, mainly as a replacement for injured Jon Ander Serantes. On 19 January 2018, already back at Athletic and during a domestic league fixture away to Getafe CF, he conceded two penalties by tripping opposing forwards, saving the second kick in an eventual 2–2 draw. The previous week, he had signed a new contract until 2021. 

On 7 January 2019, in a league match away to RC Celta de Vigo, a long kick upfield by Herrerín (now the first-choice goalkeeper following Arrizabalaga's departure to Chelsea) was collected by Iñaki Williams who ran on to score, making the former the first goalkeeper to register an assist in La Liga in the 21st century. He barely played in his final two years, due to the emergence of Unai Simón.

Al Raed
On 30 August 2021, Herrerín joined Saudi Arabian club Al Raed FC. The following 15 June, he was released from his contract by mutual consent.

Valencia
Herrerín agreed to a short-term deal at Valencia CF on 26 September 2022, following a trial; the team had just lost Jaume Doménech to a serious knee injury. He made his debut the following 3 January in a 3–0 win at CF La Nucía of the Primera Federación in the Spanish Cup's last 32, playing the final 13 minutes in place of Giorgi Mamardashvili.

International career
Herrerín made his debut for the unofficial Basque Country national team in May 2019, in a 0–0 draw away to Panama for which a small, youthful and inexperienced squad was selected.

Career statistics

Club

Honours
Athletic Bilbao
Supercopa de España: 2015

References

External links

Valencia official profile

1988 births
Living people
Spanish footballers
Footballers from Bilbao
Association football goalkeepers
La Liga players
Segunda División players
Segunda División B players
Tercera División players
Danok Bat CF players
Sestao River footballers
CD Basconia footballers
Barakaldo CF footballers
Bilbao Athletic footballers
Athletic Bilbao footballers
Atlético Madrid B players
CD Numancia players
CD Leganés players
Valencia CF players
Saudi Professional League players
Al-Raed FC players
Basque Country international footballers
Spanish expatriate footballers
Expatriate footballers in Saudi Arabia
Spanish expatriate sportspeople in Saudi Arabia